The 2022 Croatia Open  (also known as the Plava Laguna Croatia Open Umag for sponsorship reasons) was a men's tennis tournament played on outdoor clay courts. It was the 32nd edition of the Croatia Open, and part of the 250 Series of the 2022 ATP Tour. It took place at the International Tennis Center in Umag, Croatia, from 25 through 31 July 2022.

Finals

Singles 

  Jannik Sinner def.  Carlos Alcaraz, 6–7(5–7), 6–1, 6–1

Doubles 

  Simone Bolelli /  Fabio Fognini def.  Lloyd Glasspool /  Harri Heliövaara, 5–7, 7–6(8–6), [10–7]

Points and prize money

Point distribution

Prize money 

*per team

Singles main draw entrants

Seeds 

 1 Rankings are as of 18 July 2022.

Other entrants
The following players received wildcards into the main draw:
  Duje Ajduković 
  Mili Poljičak 
  Dino Prižmić

The following player received entry with a protected ranking:
  Aljaž Bedene

The following players received entry from the qualifying draw:
  Franco Agamenone 
  Marco Cecchinato 
  Corentin Moutet 
  Giulio Zeppieri

The following player received entry as a lucky loser:
  Norbert Gombos

Withdrawals 
 Before the tournament
  Nikoloz Basilashvili → replaced by  Bernabé Zapata Miralles
  Francisco Cerúndolo → replaced by  Daniel Elahi Galán
  Filip Krajinović → replaced by  Facundo Bagnis
  Jiří Veselý → replaced by  Norbert Gombos

Doubles main draw entrants

Seeds 

 1 Rankings as of 18 July 2022.

Other entrants 
The following pairs received wildcards into the doubles main draw:
  Mili Poljičak /  Nino Serdarušić 
  Antonio Šančić /  Franko Škugor

Withdrawals
 Before the tournament
  Aljaž Bedene /  Jiří Veselý → replaced by  Sander Arends /  David Pel

References

External links 
 Official website

Croatia Open Umag
2022
2022 in Croatian tennis
Croatia Open Umag